Gerardo Montenegro Ibarra (born 10 January 1966) is a Mexican politician affiliated with the Institutional Revolutionary Party (PRI). Since 2013, he was Senator of the LX and LXI Legislatures of the Mexican Congress representing Nayarit. He also served as Deputy during the LIX Legislature and a local deputy in the Congress of Nayarit.

References

1966 births
Living people
Politicians from Nayarit
Members of the Senate of the Republic (Mexico)
Members of the Chamber of Deputies (Mexico)
Institutional Revolutionary Party politicians
20th-century Mexican politicians
21st-century Mexican politicians
Members of the Congress of Nayarit